Tenampa is a municipality located in the montane central zone in the State of Veracruz, about 30 km from state capital Xalapa. It has a surface area of 69.92 km2. In 1455 war came to the municipality by means of the emperor Moctezuma. In 1514, the Spanish conquest resulted in the area being renamed, baptized as Xampala-Tenampa. In 1912 general Jiménez fought the battle of Cotlamanes's hill against the Government of Victoriano Huerta.

Geographic Limits

The municipality of  Tenampa  is delimited to the north by Tlaltetela and to the south by  Totutla. It is watered by several rivers as Huitzilapan river and La Antigua river.

Agriculture

It produces principally maize, coffee and mango.

Celebrations

In  Tenampa , in October takes place the celebration in honor to San Francisco de Asís, Patron of the town, and in December takes place the celebration in honor to Virgen de Guadalupe.

Weather

The weather in  Tenampa  is warm and wet all year with rains in summer and autumn.

References

External links 

  Municipal Official webpage
  Municipal Official Information

Municipalities of Veracruz